This is a list of lighthouses in the Isle of Man which is located in the Irish Sea between England and Ireland.

Lighthouses

See also
Registered Buildings and Conservations Areas of the Isle of Man
List of Northern Lighthouse Board lighthouses
List of lighthouses in the United Kingdom
Lists of lighthouses and lightvessels

References

External links

 

Isle of Man
List
Lighthouses